Pona or PONA may refer to:

 PONA number, an index for oil components
 Popular National Party (Tanzania)
 Francesco Pona (1595–1655), Italian doctor, philosopher and writer
 Nantachot Pona (born 1982), Thai footballer
 Ponna, a comune in Lombardy, Italy, also known as Pona

See also
 Toki Pona, a constructed language